Commander Willoughby Shortland RN (30 September 1804 – 7 October 1869) was a British naval officer and colonial administrator. He was New Zealand's first Colonial Secretary from 1841, after having arrived in New Zealand with Lieutenant Governor William Hobson in January 1840. He was later President of the island of Nevis and then Governor of Tobago.

Early life and naval career

Shortland, born in 1804, was the son of Captain Thomas George Shortland. His brothers were Edward Shortland and Peter Frederick Shortland. Willoughby was educated at the Royal Naval College, and entered the service on 9 January 1818. His first command, in 1830, was the schooner .

On 1 July 1864 he was gazetted a retired commander in the navy.

Colonial work

New Zealand
In 1839 he accompanied Captain William Hobson, the first governor of New Zealand, to that colony, which had not then been annexed by England. Lieutenant Shortland was appointed colonial secretary and a magistrate. An early court case related to the murder of European shepherd (Patrick Rooney) by Ngāpuhi known as Kihi, who was discovered and delivered up by other Ngāpuhi to the authorities at Kororareka. Shortland was in the act of a magisterial examination of the charge against Kihi on 20 April 1840 when Haratua, a chief arrived with about three hundred armed warriors and began a haka.
Shortland, believing the warriors had hostile intentions, sent for the troops. Edward Marsh Williams, who was present as a witness and who spoke Māori and understood Māori culture identified that Haratua and the warriors did not have any hostile intentions, having come over to make a public display of their abhorrence of the murder. Edward Williams persuaded Haratua and the warriors to leave and explained in a quiet way that it was ignorance of Māori culture on Shorthand's part that made him call for the troops.

Shortland proceeded to Port Nicholson, Wellington, and the English living there very willingly acknowledged Queen Victoria's authority and Shortland's nomination as their police magistrate. Shortland was appointed the first colonial secretary on 3 May 1841 and a member of the General Legislative Council courtesy of his post.

On the death of Captain Hobson on 10 September 1842, the lieutenant administered the government of New Zealand until the arrival of Captain Robert FitzRoy on 31 December 1843. During Shortland's temporary government the Wairau Affray took place on 17 June 1843, and in his dispatches to the British government he expressed his disapproval of the conduct of the settlers, to which he attributed the massacre. This action made him unpopular, and, when a report of his nomination as Governor of New Zealand was circulated, a petition was sent from Auckland praying that he might not be appointed. On 31 December 1843 he was dismissed from the colonial secretaryship by FitzRoy.

Nevis and Tobago
In 1845 became President of the island of Nevis in the Leeward Islands. After that, he was Governor of Tobago from 10 January 1854 until 1856, and then, returning to England, resided on his property, Courtlands, Charleton, Kingsbridge, Devon, until his death.

Family and death
He married, in 1841 in Auckland, Isabella Kate Johnston, daughter of Robert A. Fitzgerald of Geraldine, County Limerick. He died at Courtlands on 7 October 1869.

See also

Notes

References

1804 births
1869 deaths
Royal Navy officers
British colonial governors and administrators in Oceania
Members of the Cabinet of New Zealand
Colonial Secretaries of New Zealand
British Leeward Islands people
Governors of British Tobago
Governors of Nevis
19th-century New Zealand politicians
Members of the New Zealand Legislative Council (1841–1853)